The Five-Year Plans are a series of social and economic development initiatives issued by the Chinese Communist Party (CCP) since 1953 in the People's Republic of China. Since 1949, the CCP has shaped the Chinese economy through the plenums of its Central Committee and national congresses. The party plays a leading role in establishing the foundations and principles of Chinese communism, mapping strategies for economic development, setting growth targets, and launching reforms.

Planning is a key characteristic of the nominally socialist economies, and one plan established for the entire country normally contains detailed economic development guidelines for all its regions. In order to more accurately reflect China's transition from a Soviet-style command economy to a socialist market economy (socialism with Chinese characteristics), the plans since the 11th Five-Year Plan for 2006 to 2010 have been referred to in Chinese as "guidelines" instead of as "plans".

China's Five-Year Plans have been praised for their efficiency, capabilities and their importance to rapid economic growth, development, corporate finance and industrial policies.

First Plan (1953–1957)

Having restored a viable economic base, the leadership under Chairman Mao Zedong, Premier Zhou Enlai, and other revolutionary veterans were prepared to embark on an intensive program of industrial growth and socialization. For this purpose, the administration adopted the Soviet economic model, based on state ownership in the modern sector, large collective units in agriculture, and centralized economic planning. The Soviet approach to economic development was manifested in the First Five-Year Plan (1953–1957).

The key tasks highlighted in the Plan were:
Concentrate efforts on the construction of 694 large and medium-sized industrial projects, including 156 with the aid of the Soviet Union
Lay out the primary foundations for China's socialist industrialization
Develop agricultural producers’ cooperatives to help in the socialist transformation of the agriculture and handicraft industries
Put capitalist industry and commerce on the track of state capitalism
Facilitate the socialist transformation of private industry and commerce.

Accumulated investment in capital construction was 55 billion yuan and fixed asset increments reached 46.05 billion yuan, 1.9 times higher than at the end of 1952. About 595 large and medium-sized projects were completed and put into production, laying the framework of China's industrialization. The gross value of industrial products in 1957 increased 128.6% from 1952.

Steel production in 1953 was 1.35 million metric tons. In 1957, Soviet Union-assisted Chinese production of steel had risen to 5.35 million metric tons.
Coal production in 1957 reached 131 million tons, increasing 98% from 1952.
Gross output value from industry and agriculture rose from 30% in 1949 to 56.5% in 1957, while that of heavy industry increased from 26.4% to 48.4%. In 1957, grain production reached 195 billion kilograms and cotton output 32.8 million dan (1 dan = 50 kilograms), both surpassing the targets set in the Plan.

The two major problems that arose during this period were the following:
Agricultural production couldn't keep pace with industrial production. The Plan regarded gross industrial output value accounting for 70% of the gross output value of industry and agriculture and means of production accounting for 60% of the gross industrial output value as indicators of industrial modernization, which ignored the development agriculture in some sense.

In addition, investments in capital construction in 1956 totaled 14.735 billion yuan, increasing 70% over the previous year. Fiscal expenditure in the form of infrastructure loans rose to 48% from 30% from 1955, putting a strain on the national budget as a result.

As in the Soviet economy, the main objective was a high rate of economic growth, with primary emphasis on industrial development at the expense of agriculture and particular concentration on heavy industry and capital-intensive technology. Soviet planners helped their Chinese counterparts formulate the plan. Large numbers of Soviet engineers, technicians, and scientists assisted in developing and installing new heavy industrial facilities, including entire plants and pieces of equipment purchased from the Soviet Union.

Government control over industry was increased during this period by applying financial pressures and inducements to convince owners of private, modern firms to sell them to the state or convert them into joint public-private enterprises under state control. By 1956, approximately 67.5% of all modern industrial enterprises were state owned, and 32.5% were under joint public-private ownership, with no privately owned firms remaining. During the same period, the handicraft industries were organized into cooperatives, which accounted for 91.7% of all handicraft workers by 1956.

Agriculture also underwent extensive organizational changes. To facilitate the mobilization of agricultural resources, improve the efficiency of farming, and increase government access to agricultural products, the authorities encouraged farmers to organize cooperative farming, starting in 1953.  Since traditional family farming practices were not sufficient to bankroll the country's ambitious industrialization projects, party officials encouraged families to pool their farms into small cooperatives in order to increase farm yields.  Unlike the large scale collective farming policies which began in 1958, the cooperatives were successful and popular.  Local parties representatives, such as Geng Xiufeng, largely met support from local farmers  By the end of 1955 almost 2/3, about 60%, of all Chinese farmers were engaged in cooperative farming. Farming families, who previously engaged largely in subsistence farming, now began raising and selling livestock based on the increase in grain surpluses, which was directly responsible for the practices popularity and rapid rate of enrollment.  Central committee planning dictated that from the loosely structured, tiny mutual aid teams, villages were to advance first to lower-stage, agricultural producers' cooperatives, in which families still received some income on the basis of the amount of land they contributed, and eventually to advanced cooperatives, or collectives beginning in 1958 with the second Five Year Plan. In the agricultural producers' cooperatives, income shares were designed to be based only on the amount of labor contributed.  In reality, small farming markets that revolved around cooperative surpluses, sprang up across the nation.  The land reforms from 1949 to 1951 increased private land ownership, with typical results increasing land ownership of farmers from just under one acre to approximately three acres. The cooperative process, began in 1953, accelerated quickly, slowly from 1955 to 1956. By 1957 about 93.5% of all farm households had joined producers' cooperatives.

In terms of economic growth, the First Five-Year Plan was quite successful, especially in those areas emphasized by the Soviet-style development strategy. A solid foundation was created in heavy industry. Key industries, including iron and steel manufacturing, coal mining, cement production, electricity generation, and machine building were greatly expanded and were put on a firm, modern technological footing. Thousands of industrial and mining enterprises were constructed, including 156 major facilities. Industrial production increased at an average annual rate of 16% between 1952 and 1957, and national income grew at a rate of 9% a year.

Despite the lack of state investment in agriculture, agricultural output increased substantially, averaging increases of about 4% a year. This growth resulted primarily from gains in efficiency brought about by the reorganization and cooperation achieved through cooperative farming. As the First Five-Year Plan wore on, however, Chinese leaders became increasingly concerned over the relatively sluggish performance of agriculture and the inability of state trading companies to increase significantly the amount of grain procured from rural units for urban consumption, and for funding the many large urban industrialization projects.

Second Plan (1958–1962)

This plan was created to accomplish several tasks, including:
Expanding heavy industry in China.
Furthering the cause of socialism by transferring more property to collective ownership.
Encouraging the economic growth of China through industry, agriculture, handicrafts, transportation and commerce.
Cultivating cultural and scientific development of the Chinese people.
Strengthening national defense and improving living standards in China.

The Political Bureau of the CPC had determined that gross value of agricultural products should increase 270%; in fact, the gain was a considerably more modest 35%. The country saw increases in capital construction over those observed during the first Five-Year Plan and also saw significant increases in industry (doubling output value) and income (workers and farmers, increase by as much as 30%).

However, the Great Leap Forward, which diverted millions of agricultural workers into industry, and the great sparrow campaign, which led to an infestation of locusts, as well as unprecedented natural and weather based issues, caused a huge decrease in food production. Simultaneously, rural officials, under huge pressure to meet their quotas, vastly overstated how much grain was available. Thus, a massive nationwide famine ensued.

In 1960–61, attempts were made to redirect twenty million workers into agricultural production and to reallocate investment into those industrial sectors that could further support agriculture. This shift was in sharp contrast to the rapid industrialization seen in the first five-year plan.

Third Plan (1966–1970)
The Third Plan was originally due early in 1963, but at that time China's economy was too dislocated, as a result of the failure of the Great Leap Forward and four poor harvests to permit any planned operations. Research and study into the elements of this Plan started in early 1964. The Plan contained two comparatively detailed schemes: one was the Preliminary Tentative Plan of the 3rd Five-year Plan (1966–1970) proposed by the State Planning Commission and agreed by the Central Government Work Meeting in May 1964; the other was the Report Syllabus about the Arrangement of the 3rd Five-year Plan drawn out by the State Planning Commission and agreed by the central government in September 1965.

The Tentative Plan set out the following basic tasks:
To spare no efforts to develop agriculture, solve widespread problems concerning people's food, clothing and other basic needs;
To strengthen national defense, and endeavor to make breakthroughs in technology;
In order to support agriculture and strengthen national defense, to enhance infrastructure, continue to improve production quality, increase production variety and quantity, to build an economy of self-reliance, and to develop transportation, commerce, culture, education and scientific research.

The Plan also called for the prioritization of national defense in the light of a possible big war, actively preparing for conflicts and speeding up construction in three key areas; national defense, science and technology, and industry and transport infrastructure.

The outputs of other newly added major products were 68.06 million tons of coal; 8.60 million kilowatts of electricity; 27.77 million tons of petroleum; 6.53 million tons of steels; 35.90 million tons of iron ore; 2.44 million tons of synthesized ammonia; 2.04 million tons of fertilizers; 15.33 million tons of cement; 187,000 tons of plastics; 3.22 million tons of cotton spindles; 12,300 tons of chemical fibers; 3,894 kilometers of newly constructed railways and 31,223 kilometers of newly constructed highways were put into operation; and handling capacity of the coastal harbors were over 11.91 million tons.

This plan was more successful than anticipated, with the industrial and agricultural goals exceed by 14.1% and industrial gross output value goals by 21.1%. Agricultural gains also exceeded goals, but more moderately, with a 2.2% rise above expectations. According to the Official Portal of the Chinese Government, however, the focus on accumulation and rapid development in this and preceding plans were impediments to long-term economic development.<ref name="auto was for a revolation and soviat union

Fourth Plan (1971–1975)
A first draft of the Plan was developed and agreed upon in September 1970 at the 2nd Plenary Session of the 9th Communist Party Central Committee, which stipulated:
The average annual growth rate of gross output value of industry and agriculture reach 12.5%
130 billion yuan would be budgeted for infrastructure construction within five years
Expected industrial output would reach between 300 and 325 billion kilograms of grain, between 65 and 70 million piculs (3.9–4.2 billion kilograms) of cotton, between 35 and 40 million tons of steel, between 400 and 430 million tons of coal, between 200 and 220 billion kWh of electricity, and between 900 million and 1 billion tons of railway freight

Fourth Plan (1971–1975) 
In July 1973, the State Planning Commission amended the draft, lowering some of the targets initially set. Steel output was reduced to between 32 and 35 million tons and later further reduced to 30 million tons. The national economy took a favorable turn in 1972 and 1973. By 1973, all major economic indices had been fulfilled or exceeded, making it the year with the fastest economic growth.

Fifth Plan (1976–1980)
The central government stipulated the 1976–1985 Ten Year Plan Outline of Developing National Economy (Draft) in 1975, which included the 5th Five-Year Plan.

In March 1978, the Ten Year Development Outline was amended because the original version in 1975 stipulated that by 1985, steel and petroleum outputs should reach 60 and 250 million tons respectively, and 120 large projects, including 10 steel production bases, nine non-ferrous metal bases, eight coal bases and 10 oil and gas fields, should be built. To achieve these goals, the government would invest 70 billion yuan in infrastructure construction, equaling total national investment over the previous 28 years. These were impossible targets and ran counter to economic development rules.

The Plan put forward suggestions to set up an independent and comparatively complete industrial system and national economic system from 1978 to 1980.

With the implementation of the Plan, considerable success was achieved. In 1977, the gross output value of industry and agriculture reached 505.5 billion yuan, 4.4% above-target and representing an increase of 10.4% compared with the previous year. Gross domestic product for 1978 reached 301 billion yuan, an increase of 12.3% compared with 1977, and an increase of 19.4% compared with 1976.

However, during this period, the Chinese economy developed too quickly, and the very high goals triggered the onset of yet another round of mistakes. In December 1978, the Third Plenary Session of the 11th Communist Party Central Committee shifted the work focus of the Communist Party to modernization. The Session emphasized that the development should follow economic rules and proposed readjustment and reform measures, which indicated that national economic development had entered a new phase, one of exploration and development. In April 1979, the central government formally put forward new principles of readjustment, reform, rectification and improvement.

Note: This Summary was prepared by the China Daily newspaper, owned directly by the Chinese Communist Party

Sixth Plan (1981–1985)

This Plan took some time to draft. It was first planned as part of the "Ten Year National Economic Development Plan Outline for 1976–1985." In February 1980, the State Council decided to redraft the country's mid- and long-term plans. It convened a seminar to discuss the compilation of the 6th Five-Year Plan. To that end, the State Planning Commission and related departments also carried out extensive research and calculation work on the compilation of the Plan, and organized related experts to conduct scientific appraisals. The 1982 national planning meeting was again mainly focused on the drafting of the Plan. It was only in December that year that the fifth meeting of the Fifth National People's Congress officially ratified the Plan.

It was a more comprehensive plan compared to its predecessors since it adjusted and set national economic development onto a more stable and healthy track, with general objectives to:
Keep pursuing the principle of "adjust, reform, rectify and improve"
Further overcome the various challenges to economic development
Achieve a decisive turn in the fiscal situation
Lay a solid foundation for the advancement of national economic and social development under the next planning period.

Specific objectives included:
To achieve an average annual growth rate of 5% for industrial and agricultural products.
To keep the supply and quality of consumer products in line with the growth of social purchasing power and changes in consumption structure, and to keep market prices stable.
To vigorously cut down material consumption, particularly that of energy, and keep production in line with the availability of resources.
To encourage and implement enterprise technological updating, with energy saving as a priority, and to gather the capital necessary to strengthen the construction of key projects energy and communications in preparation for the 7th Five-Year Plan.
To assemble the country's scientific and technological base for scientific and technological research and to promote the application of new technologies, and to strenuously develop education, science and culture to accelerate the construction of an ideological and material civilization.
To strengthen the construction of the national defense industry, and enhance national defensive forces.
To strengthen production and improve economic efficiency to increase the government's revenue, to gradually increase expenditure on economic and cultural construction and to secure a balance between fiscal revenue and expenditure and credit.
To strenuously develop trade, make effective use of foreign capital and actively introduce advanced technology to meet domestic needs.
To strictly control the growth of population, make proper employment arrangement for labor forces in the cities and towns, and continuously improve the material and cultural life of people both in cities and the rural areas based on the growth of production and productive efficiency.
To strengthen environmental protection efforts.

The Plan was overall a great success:
The national economy maintained a stable rate of growth. The average annual growth rate for industrial and agricultural products was 11%. The gross national product in 1985 reached 778 billion yuan ($113 billion), signifying an average annual growth of 10% after inflation since 1980.
Production volume of key products rose dramatically. Compared with 1980, 1985 saw a growth of 26.1% for steel, 37.1% for coal, 35.8% for electricity, 17.9% for crude oil, 92.8% for cotton and 21.4% for grain.
Progress was achieved in infrastructure construction and technological updating. Total investment in fixed assets for publicly owned enterprises reached 530 billion yuan. 496 middle and large projects were constructed and started, and another 200,000 projects were transformed and updated.
The fiscal situation improved gradually year by year. Fiscal revenue grew by an average of 15.9 billion yuan every year, which represented an annual growth of 12% thereby realizing a balance between fiscal revenue and expenditure.
China's foreign trade transactions and technological exchange entered a new phase. On the world export volume ranking, China rose from No. 28 in 1980 to No .10 in 1984.

Alternatively, several negative results included a disproportionately high fixed asset ratio, rapid growth in consumption and fiscal over-supply. All of this negatively impacted the economy's stability and growth.

Note: This Summary was prepared by the China Daily newspaper, owned directly by the Chinese Communist Party

Seventh Plan (1986–1990)
In March 1986, the State Council submitted "The 7th Five Year Plan for National Economic and Social Development of the People's Republic of China, 1986–1990" to the Fourth Session of the Sixth National People's Congress for review and ratification. It was the first time in China's history that an all-round plan for social and economic development was created at the start of a new five-year plan.

The fundamental principles and guidelines of the 7th Five Year Plan were:
To put reform at the top of the agenda and coordinate economic development with reform.
To maintain a basic balance between overall social demand and supply, between the national budget, credit and materials.
To improve economic efficiency, especially that of product quality; to properly handle the relations between efficiency and growth rate, and quality and quantity.
To adapt to the changing structure of social demand and the demands of economic modernization, and to further adjust the industrial structure.
To regulate fixed asset investments, readjust the investment structure, and speed up the construction of the energy, communications, telecommunications and raw materials industries.
To shift the construction focus to the technical updating, reforming and extending of existing enterprises.
To further the development of science and education.
To further open up to the outside world, combining domestic economic growth with expanding external economic and technologic exchanges.
To further improve the material and cultural life of all Chinese people.
To strenuously boost the construction of a socialist ideological civilization along with the construction of a material civilization.
To carry on in the spirit of arduous struggle, hard work and thrift.

Specific goals of economic development set out in the Plan were:
To increase gross national industrial and agricultural output by 38% within five years, or by an average annual rate of 6.7%, gross agricultural output by 4% a year, and gross industrial output by 7.5%.
To increase gross national output by 44% within five years, or by an average annual rate of 7.5%.
Production goals for major industrial and agricultural products by 1990 were: between 425 and 450 billion tons for grain, 4.25 million tons for cotton, 550 billion kWh for electricity, 1 billion tons for raw coal, 150 million tons for crude oil, and between 55 and 58 million tons for steel. Freight volume was set at 9.4 billion tons.
Investment in fixed assets was set at 1,296 billion yuan, with fixed assets projected to grow by 600 billion yuan.
To increase total import and export volumes by 35% within the five years, while expanding the scale of foreign investment and advanced technology. Further, goals were set to increase the actual consumption of both urban and rural residents by 5% a year, and at the same time keeping the basic balance between the national budget, credit, material and foreign exchange.
In the field of education, to gradually popularize and implement the nine-year compulsory education scheme, and train five million professionals, twice that during the previous planning period.

Note: This Summary was prepared by the China Daily newspaper, owned directly by the Chinese Communist Party

Eighth Plan (1991–1995)
In March 1991, the fourth session of the Seventh National People's Congress (NPC) approved the State Council's Report entitled "The Ten-year Layout for National Economy and Social Development and 8th Five-Year Plan". Under Deng Xiaoping's leadership, this Plan marked the start of a new phase in China's development.

The national economy maintained its growth momentum during this time. Gross national product in 1995 reached 5.76 trillion yuan ($730 billion), 4.3 times higher than that in 1980.

Outputs of coal, cement, TV, foodstuff, cotton and cotton dresses were the highest in the world, with steel and chemical fiber outputs second, and electricity supply third.

China's economy experienced an annual growth of 11%, 4 percentage points higher than that during the 7th Five-Year planning period.

Total investment in fixed assets during this time hit 3.89 trillion yuan, with an annual growth rate of 17.9%, 13.6 percentage points higher than the previous planning period. Of these, state-owned units’ investments saw an annual growth of 22.9%, much higher than the average growth of 4.1% previously.

845 large and medium-sized infrastructure projects were completed and put into production, as were 374 technical innovation projects. In terms of transportation infrastructure, 5,800 kilometers of trunk railway, 3,400 kilometers of double-track lines, and 2,600 kilometers of electrified railway were built. Road lengths were increased by 105,000 kilometers, including 1,600 kilometers of highway.

The throughput of ports increased by 138 million tons and 12 new airports were built. 100,000 kilometers of long-distance trunk cable were finished, and the number of telephone switchboards increased to 58.95 million sets. Total installed generation capacity was increased to 75 million kilowatts, and annual electricity supply grew by 9%.

Output value of the primary industry increased at an annual growth rate of 4.1%, the secondary industry at a rate of 17.3%, and the tertiary industry at a rate of 9.5%. Output composition of the three sectors stood at 20.3: 47.7:32.0; it was 28.4:43.1:28.5 at the end of the 6th, and 27.1:41.6:31.3 at the end of the 7th Five-Year Program periods respectively.

Significant achievements were also made in the reform of the economic system. The new financial system with tax decentralization at its core, and the new tax system with value-added tax as its main component, were set up. Policy finance and commercial finance were gradually separated. A macro regulating system emerged, and the market started to play a more major role in resource allocation. Also mapped out were the beginnings of a dominant public sector.

More than 1,100 cities at county level were opened to the outside world, and 13 bonded zones and other a lot of economic development zones were set up.

Foreign trade developed at an astonishing pace with total trade volume reaching US$1.0145 trillion, at an annual growth rate of 19.5%, higher than the 12.8% and 10.6% growth rates during the 6th and 7th Five-Year periods respectively. The value of annual export volume was 100 billion yuan, accounting for 3% of the world's commodity trade.

By import and export trade volume, China ranked 11th in the world in 1995.

Foreign exchange reserves reached US$73.6 billion, 5.6 times higher than that at the end of the 7th Five-Year period.

Major improvements were also made to people's lives. Per capita income was 1,578 yuan in 1995 ($230). Retail sales reached 6.7275 trillion yuan, representing an annual growth rate of 10.6% as compared to 3.3% during the 7th Five-Year period. Savings deposit balances in urban and rural areas reached 3 trillion yuan, 2 trillion higher than at the end of the previous planning period.

Per capita floor space of newly built houses in urban and rural areas reached 4.3 billion square meters. At the end of 1994, rural residents' per capita living space was 20.5 square meters, and 7.7 square meters for urban residents.

China registered an increase of 50 million in terms of social labor forces, including 37.4 million in the urban areas. The population of the extreme poor decreased from 85 million at the end of the 1980s to 65 million in 1995.

Population control was achieved during this period, with growth rates dropping from 14.4% in 1990 to 10.6% in 1995. Rates of radio and TV population coverage reached 78.7% and 84.8% respectively, 4 and 5% respectively higher than in 1990.

Ninth Plan (1996–2000)
The Fifth Plenary Session of the 14th CPC Central Committee adopted the Proposal on the Ninth Five-Year Plan on National Economy and Social Development and Long-Range Objectives to the Year 2010 on 28 September 1995. It was the first medium-length plan made under a socialist market economy, and a cross-century development strategy.

The basic tasks stipulated in the Plan were to complete the second phase in the modernization drive; to cap population growth at 300 million by 2000; to quadruple per capita GNP as compared to 1980; to eliminate poverty; and to speed up the establishment of a modern enterprise system.

Long-range objectives to the year 2010 were to double 2000's GNP; and to continue to build the socialist market economic system.

Tenth Plan (2001–2005)
The basic tasks set out in the 10th Plan were:
Achieve an average annual economic growth rate of about 7%.
Achieve a GDP of 12,500 billion yuan by 2005, calculated at 2000 prices, and per capita GDP of 9,400 yuan.
Increase the number of urban employees and the number of surplus rural laborers transferred to the cities to 40 million each, thereby controlling registered urban unemployment rates at about 5%.
Keep prices stable, and to maintain the balance between international revenue and expenditure.
Optimize and upgrade the industrial structure, and strengthen China's international competitiveness.
Achieve growth for the primary, secondary and tertiary industries at the rates of 13, 51 and 36% respectively of GDP, with those employed by these industries accounting for 44, 23 and 33% of the total number of employees in the country.
Improve the national economy and social IT levels.
Kick-start the operations of more infrastructure facilities.
Bring the development disparity between regions under effective control, and raise levels of urbanization.
Raise research and development funding to more than 1.5% of GDP, and strengthen sci-tech innovation capabilities, thereby speeding up technological progress.
Increase gross enrollment rates in junior high schools, senior high schools and higher education institutions to over 90%, 60% and 15% respectively.
Reduce natural population growth rate to less than nine per thousand, and capping population at no more than 1.33 billion by 2005.

On the environmental front, to increase forest coverage to 18.2%, and the urban green rate to 35%. The total amount of major urban and rural pollutants discharged will be reduced by 10% as compared with 2000, and more measures would be taken to protect and save natural resources.

The Plan also set out to increase the growth rates of disposable income of urban residents and the net income of rural residents to five percent each. In addition, objectives were set to increase housing floor space per urban resident to 22 sq m by 2005, and to install 40% of all households in China with cable TV.

Another key objective was to improve medical and health services in both urban and rural areas.

Eleventh Plan (2006–2010)

According to draft guidelines submitted to the 2006 National People's Congress session, the goals of the Eleventh Five-Year Guideline were:

Economic growth:
GDP up 7.5% annually from 18.2 trillion yuan in 2005 to 26.1 trillion yuan in 2010;
Per capita GDP up 6.6% annually from 13,985 yuan in 2005 to 19,270 yuan in 2010.

Economic structure:
Share of service industry's value added to GDP up from 40.3% in 2005 to 43.3% in 2010;
Share of employment in service industry up from 31.3% to 35.3% in 2010;
Share of research and development (R&D) spending out of total GDP up from 1.3% in 2005 to 2% in 2010;
Urbanization rate up from 43% in 2005 to 47% in 2010.

Population, resources, environment:
Population up from 1.30756 billion in 2005 to 1.36000 billion in 2010;
Energy consumption per unit of GDP down 20% in five years;
Water consumption per unit of industrial added value down 30% in five years;
Coefficient of effective use of water for irrigation up from 0.45% in 2005 to 0.5% in 2010;
Rate of comprehensive use of solid industrial waste up from 55.8% in 2005 to 60% in 2010;
Total acreage of cultivated land down from 122 million hectares in 2005 to 120 million in 2010;
Total discharge of major pollutants down 20% in five years;
Forest coverage up from 18.2% in 2005 to 20% in 2010.

Public service, people's life:
Term of education per capita up from 8.5 years in 2005 to nine years in 2010;
Coverage of urban basic old-age pension up from 174 million people in 2005 to 223 million people in 2010;
Coverage of the new rural cooperative medical care system up from 23.5% in 2005 to over 80% in 2010;
New jobs created for urban residents reaching 45 million in five years;
Number of rural laborers transferred to non-agriculture sectors reaching 45 million in five years;
Urban registered unemployment rate up from 4.2% in 2005 to 5% in 2010;
Per capita disposable income of urban residents up 5% annually in five years, from 10,493 yuan in 2005 to 13,390 yuan in 2010;
Per capita net income of rural residents up 5% annually in five years, from 3,255 yuan in 2005 to 4,150 yuan in 2010.

Twelfth Plan (2011–2015)
The Twelfth Five-Year Guideline was debated in mid-October 2010 at the fifth plenary session of the 17th Central Committee of the Chinese Communist Party, the same session in which Xi Jinping was selected as Vice Chairman of the Central Military Commission. A full proposal for the plan was released following the plenum and approved by the National People's Congress on 14 March 2011, with the goals of addressing rising inequality and creating an environment for more sustainable growth by prioritizing more equitable wealth distribution, increased domestic consumption, and improved social infrastructure and social safety nets.

The plan is representative of China's efforts to rebalance its economy, shifting emphasis from investment towards consumption and development from urban and coastal areas toward rural and inland areas – initially by developing small cities and greenfield districts to absorb coastal migration. The plan also continues to advocate objectives set out in the Eleventh Five-Year Plan to enhance environmental protection, accelerate the process of opening and reform, and emphasize Hong Kong's role as a center of international finance.

The targets for the Twelfth Five-Year Guideline in 2011 were to grow of GDP by around 8%, 7% annual growth of per capita income, spend 2.2% of GDP on research and development by 2015, bring the population below 1.39 billion by 2015, readjust income distribution to stop the yawning gap, firmly curb excessive rise of housing prices, implement prudent monetary policy, intensify anti-corruption efforts, accelerate economic restructuring, and deal with the complex situations in development in 2011.

Among the other highlights of draft plan distributed to the media prior to the opening of the Fourth Session of the 11th NPC are:
 Urbanization rate reaching 51.5%
 Value-added output of emerging strategic industries accounting for 8% of GDP
 Inviting of foreign investment in modern agriculture, high-tech, and environment protection industries
 Moving coastal regions from being the "world's factory" to hubs of research and development, high-end manufacturing, and the service sector
 More efficient development of nuclear power under the precondition of ensured safety
 Increased momentum for large-scale hydropower plants in southwest China
 Length of high-speed railways reaching 45,000 km
 Length of highway networks reaching 83,000 km
 A new airport being built in Beijing
 36 million new affordable apartments for low-income people

Thirteenth Plan (2016–2020)

Focus areas
 Innovation: Move up in the value chain by abandoning old heavy industry and building up bases of modern information-intensive infrastructure
 Achieve significant results in innovation-driven development
 Balancing: Bridge the welfare gaps between countryside and cities by distributing and managing resources more efficiently
 Greening: Develop environmental technology industry, as well as ecological living and ecological culture. 
 Achieve an overall improvement in the quality of the environment and ecosystems
 Opening up: Deeper participation in supranational power structures, more international co-operation
 Sharing: Encourage people of China to share the fruits of economic growth, so to bridge the existing welfare gaps
 Healthcare: Implement universal healthcare proposed in 2020 Health Action Plan.
 Moderately prosperous society: Finish building a moderately prosperous society in all respects

Policies 
 "Everyone is an entrepreneur, creativity of the masses"
 "Made in China 2025" (中国制造2025)
 Initiative to comprehensively upgrade Chinese industry and to obtain a bigger part of the global production chains.
 Aims to address four worrying trends in current situation:
 (Nationally) vital technologies lack a (domestic) core platform
 Chinese industrial products are perceived internationally as inferior quality
 Domestic industrial competition is fierce due to overly homogeneous structure
 Poor conversion of academic research results to practical application
 "Economy needs a Rule of Law" (建构法制经济)
 "National defense reform"
 Organisational reform of the army, slashing number of highest generals, as well as concentrating branches' functions, moving some under Defence Ministry 
 "New national Urbanization" (国家新型城镇化)
 "Reformed one-child policy"
 Now called "two-child policy"

Fourteenth Plan (2021–2025)
The 14th Five-Year Plan was drafted during the fifth plenum of the 19th Central Committee held from 26 to 29 October 2020. Han Wenxiu, the deputy director of the Office of the Central Finance and Economic Commission, said Chinese leader Xi Jinping had personally led the drafting process through multiple meetings of the Politburo, its standing committee, and the drafting panel that he headed.

The plan was drafted against the backdrop of worsening China–United States relations and the COVID-19 pandemic, which caused China's economy to shrink in the first quarter of 2020 – the first time in 44 years. The plan includes:

Economy
Broadly outlined in late October 2020, the new plan aims at China becoming a "moderately developed" economy by 2035 with a per capita GDP of about US$30,000, nearly three times the 2020 level. It anticipates future growth as largely based on domestic consumption of goods and services, and aims to reduce disparities between urban and rural living standards. The plan includes the "peaceful development" of relations with Taiwan, considered "a rebel province and part of Chinese territory." The Chinese Government also wishes to expand its role in the economy by implementing market restrictions, furthering the implementation of the Belt and Road Initiative.

Dual Circulation and Secure Supply Chains: The trade war between the United States and China caused Xi to roll out "dual circulation", with "internal circulation" and "external circulation" servicing domestic and foreign trade respectively.

Environment
Economists expect the plan's target growth rate for the period to exceed five percent annually. The 2021–2025 plan is anticipated to have aggressive goals on sustainable energy in order to reach China's announced goals of carbon neutrality by no later than 2060.
New Energy Technologies: Xi Jinping has announced that new energy technologies such as car batteries from state-owned enterprises will make it so that half of the vehicles in China be electric or fuel-cell powered, and half hybrid by 2035.
Develop a plan to achieve peak carbon emissions by the end of the 2020s.
Increase the proportion of non-fossil fuel energy use to 20% by 2025,  compared to 15% at the end of 2019.
Improve water conservation infrastructure.

Energy
Recommendations regarding the development of up to 60 gigawatts hydropower capacity on the Yarlung Tsangbo.

Transport 

 Improve civil aviation, including the construction of 30 new airports.
 Completion of the "Eight Vertical and Eight Horizontal" high-speed rail network.
 Focus on improving transportation to Xinjiang and Tibet and improve international border connections.

Research and development

The plan aims to increase China's scientific and technical capabilities. China aims to make "major breakthroughs in core technologies".

The plan aims to increase R&D spending every year by 7%, with the proportion of that going to basic research increasing from 6% to more than 8%. and aid the development of real-world applications by fostering closer links between business, industry, and academia – historically such links have been weak. Businesses will be encouraged to invest in R&D through tax incentives.

The plan aims to boost quantum information and computing, brain science, semiconductors, seed industry, genetic research, regenerative medicine, biotechnology, clinical medicine and health, and deep space, deep sea and polar exploration.

The Chinese government added that it would increase spending on basic research (that is, studies of potential breakthroughs) by 10.6 percent in 2021, and would create a 10-year research strategy.

China still is unable to independently develop advanced semiconductors that match the performance of those made in Taiwan or South Korea. Acknowledging the challenges that lay ahead, influential officials, entrepreneurs, and academics have evoked the “patriotic spirit of scientists” and called on Chinese students and entrepreneurs to “gnaw on the hard bones” to help China build an independent, controllable semiconductor supply chain.

China has more than 7,200 licensed seed companies but few have the capability for innovation. Tang Renjian, Minister of Agriculture and Rural Affairs, said the ministry is studying a plan to help its animal and plant breeding sector close the gap with foreign countries.

About a trillion dollars of government funding have been set aside under the technology initiative, part of which will be used by central and local governments to jointly invest in a series of third-generation chip projects, according to people with knowledge of the matter.

“For our country, technology and innovation is not just a matter of growth,” Liu He told a three-story auditorium packed with China's top scientists in a separate meeting in May 2021. “It's also a matter of survival.”

Urbanization 

 Lifting of restrictions on Hukou system for cities under 3 million urban residents and relax it for larger cities. All urban residents will obtain full access to basic urban public services, and rural migrants will be able to get urban residency.
 Development of clusters of large, medium-sized, and small cities.

See also 

Five-year plan (disambiguation)
Five-year plans of the Soviet Union
Five-Year Plans of Vietnam
State capitalism

References

Economic history of the People's Republic of China
Five-year plans